Kim Su-hyeon (born February 20, 1970) is a South Korean actor. Best known as a supporting actor (notably in films directed by Ryoo Seung-wan), Kim played his first feature film leading role in the indie Sleepless Night (2013).

Filmography

Film
 Lament (1997)
 The Old Miner's Song (1999)
 The Happy Funeral Director (2000)
 Die Bad (2000)
 Failan (2001)
 Take Care of My Cat (2001)
 No Blood No Tears (2002)
 Oh! LaLa Sisters (2002)
 Saving My Hubby (2002)
 Show Show Show (2003)
 Tube (2003)
 Oldboy (2003)
 Family Picture (short film, 2003)
 Arahan (2004)
 Twentidentity (2004) (segment: "Sutda")
 Crying Fist (2005)
 Heaven's Soldiers (2005)
 If You Were Me 2 (2005) (segment: "Hey, Man~")
 The City of Violence (2006)
 Three Fellas  (2006)
 Once Upon a Time (2008)
 Humming (2008)
 Dachimawa Lee (2008)
 Spare (2008)
 Here I Am (short film, 2008)
 Republic of Korea 1%  (2010)
 The Unjust (2010)
 Sleepless Night (2013)
 Guardian (2014)
 Futureless Things (2014)
 Set Me Free (2014)
 Innocence (2020)

Television
 Korean Peninsula (TV Chosun, 2012)
 Drama Special "The Great Dipper" (KBS2, 2012)
 Forest (KBS2, 2020)

Theater
Le Visiteur (2008)
Love Is Coming  (2010-2011)
Ogamdo  (2010)
 The Murder of President Lee  (2010)
Uncle Vanya (2010)
My Mother  (2011)
Alone in Love  (2011)
Hedda Gabler (2012)
Mr. Bird Goes to the Night Market to Buy a Sheep  (2012)
내일 공연인데 어떡하지! (2013)
12 Wells Road  (2014)
내일도 공연할 수 있을까? (2014)
The Tale of the Stolen Manpasikjeok  (2014)

Awards and nominations
2008  Korea Theater Awards: Best New Actor (Le Visiteur)
2008 Dong-A Theatre Awards: Best New Actor (Le Visiteur)
2008  Heeseo Theater Awards: Most Promising Newcomer (Le Visiteur)
2014 Wildflower Film Awards: Nominated, Best Actor (Sleepless Night)

References

External links

1970 births
Living people
South Korean male stage actors
South Korean male film actors
South Korean male television actors
Chung-Ang University alumni
21st-century South Korean male actors
South Korean Buddhists